George Tierney PC (20 March 1761 – 25 January 1830) was an Irish Whig politician. For much of his career he was in opposition to the governments of William Pitt and Lord Liverpool. From 1818 to 1821 he was Leader of the Opposition in the House of Commons.

Background and education
Born in Gibraltar, Tierney was the son of Thomas Tierney, a wealthy Irish merchant of London, who was living in Gibraltar as prize agent. He was sent to Eton and Peterhouse, Cambridge, where he took the degree of Law in 1784. He was called to the bar from Lincoln's Inn in the same year, but abandoned law and plunged into politics.  On 10 July 1789 he married Anna Maria Miller of Stapleton in Gloucestershire; she died in 1844.

Political career

Early career
Tierney contested Colchester in 1788, when both candidates received the same number of votes, but Tierney was declared elected. He was, however, defeated in the 1790 general election.

He returned to Parliament in 1796 for Southwark and sat for that seat until 1806, and then represented in turn Athlone (1806–1807), Bandon (1807–1812), Appleby (1812–1818), and Knaresborough (1818–1830). During his early years in Parliament he was known for his radical views and was a supporter of Charles James Fox. The French Revolution of 1789 was a polarising force in British Whig politics with some supporting the revolution, and others such as Edmund Burke strongly opposed to it. Because of his radical views, Tierney was often portrayed in caricatures in the costume of a French revolutionary.

Duel
When Charles James Fox seceded from the House of Commons, Tierney emerged as one of the most prominent opponents of William Pitt's foreign policy. In May 1798, Pitt accused him of want of patriotism. A duel ensued at Putney Heath on Sunday, 27 May 1798; but neither combatant was injured.

Office
In 1803, Tierney, partly because peace had been ratified with France at Amiens, and partly because Pitt was out of office, joined the ministry of Henry Addington as Treasurer of the Navy, and was created a Privy Councillor; but this alienated many of his supporters among the middle classes, and offended most of the influential Whigs. On the death of Fox in 1806 he joined William Grenville's Ministry of All the Talents as President of the Board of Control, with a seat in the cabinet, and thus brought himself once more into line with the Whigs. He left office the following year when Grenville's government fell and was replaced by the Tories, who were to dominate office for the next generation. Tierney was in opposition for the following twenty years.

Opposition
About a year after the death of George Ponsonby in 1817, Tierney reluctantly became the recognised leader of the opposition in the House of Commons. 
At first he was successful, with Whig gains being made at the 1818 general election. 
On 18 May 1819, Tierney moved a motion in the House of Commons for a committee on the state of the nation. This motion was defeated by 357 to 178, which was a division involving the largest number of MPs until the debates over the Reform bill in the early 1830s. 
Foord comments that "this defeat put an effective end to Tierney's leadership... Tierney did not disclaim the leadership until 23 Jan. 1821 ..., but he had ceased to exercise its functions since the great defeat".

Final years

In George Canning's ministry, he was Master of the Mint, and when Lord Goderich succeeded to the lead Tierney was admitted to the cabinet; but he was already suffering from ill-health and died suddenly at Savile Row, London.

References

Attribution:

Sources
 Parliamentary Election Results in Ireland 1801–1922, edited by B. M. Walker (Royal Irish Academy 1978).
 His Majesty's Opposition 1714–1830, by Archibald S. Foord (Oxford University Press 1964)

External links 

 

H

1761 births
1830 deaths
Alumni of Peterhouse, Cambridge
British duellists
Members of the Parliament of Great Britain for English constituencies
Members of the Privy Council of the United Kingdom
Members of the Parliament of the United Kingdom for County Cork constituencies (1801–1922)
Members of the Parliament of the United Kingdom for Athlone
Masters of the Mint
People educated at Eton College
Whig (British political party) MPs for English constituencies
Whig (British political party) MPs for Irish constituencies
Gibraltarians
UK MPs 1801–1802
UK MPs 1802–1806
UK MPs 1806–1807
UK MPs 1807–1812
UK MPs 1812–1818
UK MPs 1818–1820
UK MPs 1820–1826
UK MPs 1826–1830
British MPs 1784–1790
British MPs 1796–1800
British people of Irish descent
Presidents of the Board of Control